On 27 March 1993, the Red Army Faction (RAF) bombed and destroyed a newly built prison in Weiterstadt, near Frankfurt am Main in Germany. It was the RAF's last major action before it dissolved.

At least three armed and masked men and a woman climbed a high wall and entered the guardhouse around 1 am. The terrorists tied the 10 guards and locked them in a van near a landfill. They then brought in five cargoes with 200 kg of explosives. At 5:12 am, the explosives were detonated.

The Weiterstadt prison took eight years to build and cost 250 million Marks ($155 million). It was designed to be multi-use and high-tech. The blast managed to destroy the administration building and much of its security system. At the time the prison was not holding inmates yet - they were expected by May. Over $90 million in damages was caused.

The prison had to be rebuilt, which took another four years when it opened and received inmates in May 1997.

Fourteen years later in 2007, using DNA analysis, detectives identified three perpetrators - Burkhard Garweg, Ernst-Volker Wilhelm Staub and Daniela Klette. Klette had already been wanted over the American embassy sniper attack in 1991. However all the three suspects are at large.

References

1993 in Germany
March 1993 events in Europe
Terrorist incidents in Germany
Terrorist incidents in Germany in 1993
Red Army Faction
1993 crimes in Germany